Valka Parish is an administrative territorial entity of Valka Municipality, Latvia. It was an administrative unit of Valka District. The administrative center is Lugaži.

Towns, villages and settlements of Valka Parish 
 Alieši
 Bērzezers
 Lugaži
 Pedele
 Saule
 Sēļi
 Tomēni
 Zīle

References

External links

Parishes of Latvia
Valka Municipality